Substation 219, also known as the Harlem Substation, is a historic electrical substation located in Harlem, New York, New York. It was constructed by the Independent Subway System in 1932 to provide power to the IND Eighth Avenue Line.  It is a single-story, double-height masonry building in the Art Deco style.  It features a low brick parapet topped by a band of limestone coping and a limestone frieze consisting of diamond-shaped limestone pieces and a brick chevron pattern.  The main entrance doors are faced in aluminium and incorporate Art Deco-style geometric motifs.

It was listed on the National Register of Historic Places in 2006.

References

Buildings and structures on the National Register of Historic Places in Manhattan
Industrial buildings and structures on the National Register of Historic Places in New York City
Art Deco architecture in Manhattan
Energy infrastructure completed in 1932
Industrial buildings and structures in Manhattan
Harlem
New York City Subway infrastructure
1932 establishments in New York City
Independent Subway System